Wingfield is a village in the English county of Suffolk.

Wingfield Castle, which is now a private house, was for many centuries the home of the Wingfield family and their heirs, the De La Poles, Earls and Dukes of Suffolk. The Wingfields were a very ancient family and Sir John de Wingfield was chief of staff to the Black Prince.

Sir John de Wingfield founded the great 14th-century church at Wingfield and his tomb can be found within it. Here visitors can see fine church monuments of Sir John de Wingfield and the De la Pole family.  The church contains the effigy of Michael de la Pole Earl of Suffolk, and his wife Katherine. This Earl died of dysentery at  the Siege of Harfleur whilst with Henry V on his Agincourt campaign of 1415. The Earl's son, also Michael, who was with his father, succeeded to the title but was killed a few weeks later whilst fighting under the King at the actual battle of Agincourt. The title then passed to the second son, William, who was aged fifteen at the time. William de la Pole, later first Duke of Suffolk, who was murdered after being exiled in 1450, was buried by his widow, Alice Chaucer, in the family church of the Charterhouse, Kingston upon Hull, as was his wish, and not in Wingfield church as is often stated.

St Andrew's church contains fifteen 15th-century misericords. It is worth noting that they have more than a family resemblance to those at Sutton Courtenay now in Oxfordshire, but pre-1974 in Berkshire, and those at Soham in Cambridgeshire.

The church's Tudor organ has been reconstructed and tours the country. It features in the film The Elusive English Organ.

Wingfield College

Wingfield College is a remnant of the college founded by the will of Sir John de Wingfield in 1362, and endowed by the Black Prince in his will. The college had a master, nine secular chaplains and three choral scholarships for boys. These persons were required to live at the college, pray for Sir John, the Black Prince and Edward III, run a boarding school and minister to the parish. In 1542, however, the college was dissolved and a large part was demolished. The remaining wings were remodelled in Palladian style in the 18th century. It was not until a previous owner, Ian Chance, came into possession that restoration revealed the 14th-century structure. Since 1981 the adjacent Wingfield College Farm has run a regular series of concerts, recitals and lectures, with exhibitions including ceramics, textiles and contemporary art and a creative arts visitor centre, known as Wingfield Arts. In 2009 a Community Interest Company (CIC) was formed to formally take on the leasehold of the buildings and run the artistic programming and venue hirings.

Sir John Wingfield's daughter and heiress married Michael de la Pole, later 1st Earl of Suffolk. Their great-grandson, John de la Pole, 2nd Duke of Suffolk, married Princess Elizabeth of York, sister to Kings Edward IV and Richard III. Their son, John de la Pole, Earl of Lincoln was King Richard's heir and attempted to claim the English throne. His brother, Edmund de la Pole, 3rd Duke of Suffolk, followed him and was therefore imprisoned by his rival, King Henry VII. He was then beheaded, without trial, on the orders of Henry VIII, who then confiscated the castle and the De La Pole estates for himself.

Other burials
John de la Pole, 2nd Duke of Suffolk
Elizabeth of York, Duchess of Suffolk

References

External links

Wingfield Barns - website for Wingfield Barns
Wingfield Parish Council - website for Wingfield Parish Council

Mid Suffolk District
Villages in Suffolk
Burial sites of the House of Plantagenet
Burial sites of the De la Pole family
Civil parishes in Suffolk